Yentna Glacier is a glacier in Denali National Park and Preserve in the U.S. state of Alaska. The glacier begins in the Alaska Range between Mount Russell and Mount Foraker, moving southwest. It is the source of the east fork of the Yentna River. Lacuna Glacier is a major tributary, and Dall Glacier enters the glacial valley just below Yentna Glacier's present terminus.

See also
 List of glaciers

References

External links
 Flickr: Photo

Glaciers of Matanuska-Susitna Borough, Alaska
Glaciers of Denali National Park and Preserve
Glaciers of Alaska